Ronald Hildersley (born 6 April 1965) is a Scottish former professional footballer who played as a midfielder.

Although born in Scotland, Hildersley was an apprentice with Manchester City, who he made one Football League appearance for. After a loan spell with Chester City in the closing stages of the 1983–84 season he then joined the club permanently. He then played for Rochdale (1985–1986), Preston North End (1986–1988) and Cambridge United (1988, loan), before joining Division Two side Blackburn Rovers in July 1988.

Hildersley made 30 league appearances for the Ewood Park club before moving to Wigan Athletic two years later, followed by a spell with Halifax Town. After their relegation out of the Football League in 1993, Hildersley returned to Scotland and played for East Fife and Montrose. He retired from playing after the 1997–98 season. In 1991, he played for Montreal Supra of the Canadian Soccer League. In 2000, he was working for J D Williams in Shaw nr Oldham.

References

External links

1965 births
Living people
Footballers from Kirkcaldy
Scottish footballers
Manchester City F.C. players
Chester City F.C. players
Rochdale A.F.C. players
Preston North End F.C. players
Cambridge United F.C. players
Blackburn Rovers F.C. players
Wigan Athletic F.C. players
Halifax Town A.F.C. players
East Fife F.C. players
Montrose F.C. players
English Football League players
Association football midfielders
Montreal Supra players